Wilson Adalberto Folleco Morales (born 4 September 1989) is an Ecuadorian footballer currently playing for Gualaceo Sporting Club.

Club career
Folleco started playing professionally for Imbabura. He spent about a year playing there and already got interest from many teams because of his versatile position. He was loaned out to Deportivo Cuenca in the 2008 season. He had a spectacular season with Cuenca even though they did not do very well in the liguilla final.

He played seven times for Barcelona Sporting Club during the 2009 season.

In 2019, Folleco joined Gualaceo Sporting Club.

International career
Folleco played in the 2007 Pan American Games with Ecuador. He was called up for the 2009 South American Youth Championship.

Honours

National Team
  Ecuador U-20
 Pan American Games: Gold Medal

References

1989 births
Living people
People from Imbabura Province
Association football wingers
Ecuadorian footballers
Ecuador international footballers
Imbabura S.C. footballers
C.D. Cuenca footballers
Barcelona S.C. footballers
C.S.D. Macará footballers
S.D. Quito footballers
C.D. El Nacional footballers
Footballers at the 2011 Pan American Games
Pan American Games competitors for Ecuador
Footballers at the 2007 Pan American Games
Medalists at the 2007 Pan American Games
Pan American Games gold medalists for Ecuador
Pan American Games medalists in football